Blechacz is a surname. Notable people with the surname include:

 Bernadetta Blechacz (born 1955), Polish javelin thrower
 Rafał Blechacz (born 1985), Polish classical pianist

Polish-language surnames